Thomas Brady (born 22 July 1991 in Basingstoke) is a British slalom canoeist who competed at the international level from 2007 to 2014.

He won a bronze medal in the K1 team event at the 2014 ICF Canoe Slalom World Championships at Deep Creek Lake. He also won a silver medal at the same event at the 2014 European Canoe Slalom Championships in Vienna.

References

1991 births
English male canoeists
Living people
Medalists at the ICF Canoe Slalom World Championships
Sportspeople from Basingstoke